Eddie Brown may refer to:

Eddie Brown (wide receiver) (born 1962), American football wide receiver
Eddie Brown (safety) (born 1952), American football defensive back
Eddie Brown (musician), American singer and music producer of the duo Joe and Eddie 
Eddie Brown (arena football) (born 1969), American arena football player
Eddie Brown (Australian footballer) (1877–1934), Australian rules footballer
Eddie Brown (Canadian football) (born 1966), American slotback in the Canadian Football League
Eddie Brown (baseball) (1891–1956), American baseball outfielder
Eddie Brown (cricketer) (1911–1978), English cricketer
Eddie Brown (footballer, born 1927) (1927–1996), English footballer
Eddie Brown (footballer, born 2000), English footballer
Eddy Brown (1926–2012), English footballer
Eddie "Bongo" Brown (1932–1984), American Motown percussionist
Eddie Brown (dancer) (1918–1992), American dancer
Eddie C. Brown (born 1940), American investment manager, entrepreneur and philanthropist
Eddie Brown, Jamaican banjo player who recorded with Stanley Motta

Others
 "Eddie Brown", an alternative title of The Brothers Four's song "Sama Kama Wacky Brown"

See also
Edward Brown (disambiguation)